Diisopropyl methylphosphonate (DIMP), also known as diisopropyl methane-phosphonate and phosphonic acid and methyl-bis-(1-methylethyl)ester, is a chemical by-product in the production of sarin gas.

DIMP is a colorless liquid that has been shown to affect the hematological (blood forming) system in animals. Its chemical formula is C7H17O3P.

History
DIMP is a chemical by-product resulted from the manufacture of sarin (GB).

Use
No commercial uses of DIMP are known to exist.

Occurrences
DIMP is not known to occur naturally in the environment.

Productions

Synthesis
DIMP can be prepared by a gradual addition of triisopropyl phosphite with methyl iodide, utilizing distillation technique.

References

Phosphonates
Isopropyl esters
Nerve agent precursors